Saleh Gomaa (born 1 August 1993) is an Egyptian professional footballer who formerly played for Al Ahly and currently plays for Ismailia based club, Ismaily SC, and the Egyptian national team. He competed at the 2012 Summer Olympics and the 2013 African U-20 Championship. As a 19-year-old, he played at the 2013 African U-20 championship in Algeria and won "The Player of the Tournament" award, when the Egyptians won their trophy. He is the elder brother of the Egyptian footballer Abdallah Gomaa.

Career
Gomaa  has played for the Egypt national team and was the youngest player in the squad when he represented Egypt at the 2012 London Olympics. In just one year, Gomaa represented Egypt for the U20, U23, and the first team squads.

With clubs

International career
Gomaa was a member of the Egypt national under-20 football team that won the 2013 African U-20 Championship in Algeria. He scored two goals in the competition, including a penalty in the final against Ghana. He was selected as the best player of the tournament.

Gomaa was a key player for the Egyptian team at the CAF U23 Championship in Morocco.

Honours
Al Ahly
 Egyptian Premier League: 2015–16, 2016–17, 2017–18, 2018–19
 Egypt Cup: 2017
Enppi
 Egypt Cup: 2010–11
Egypt
 2013 African U-20 Championship

References

1993 births
Living people
Egyptian footballers
Olympic footballers of Egypt
Footballers at the 2012 Summer Olympics
2013 African U-20 Championship players
Egypt international footballers
ENPPI SC players
Primeira Liga players
Association football midfielders
Al Ahly SC players
Egyptian Premier League players
Egyptian expatriate sportspeople in Portugal
Egyptian expatriate sportspeople in Saudi Arabia
Expatriate footballers in Portugal
Expatriate footballers in Saudi Arabia
Saudi Professional League players
Al-Faisaly FC players
People from North Sinai Governorate